The International may refer to:

The International (Dota 2), the annual esports tournament for the video game Dota 2
The International (2006 film), a 2006 Turkish film written and directed by Sırrı Süreyya Önder
The International (2009 film), a 2009 film starring Clive Owen and Naomi Watts
The International (TV series), an upcoming television series starring Dolph Lundgren
The International (golf), a golf tournament on the United States PGA tour 
The International (greyhounds), a former greyhound racing competition
The International (play), a 1927 play by American playwright John Howard Lawson
The International, a literary journal founded in 1912 by George Sylvester Viereck
The International, a character in the television cartoon Popeye 
 A short name for The International Society of Sculptors, Painters and Gravers
The International Nightclub Manchester, in England
"The Internationale", an anthem of international socialism
One of several political internationals, typically communist or socialist political organisations that span multiple countries
(see List of left-wing internationals)
The various editions of Webster's New International Dictionary, used as a jocular allusion to these political organisations

See also
International (disambiguation)
Internationale (disambiguation)